Saint-Germain-Nuelles is a commune in the Rhône department in Auvergne-Rhône-Alpes region in eastern France. It is the result of the merger, on 1 January 2013, of the communes of Saint-Germain-sur-l'Arbresle and Nuelles.

See also
Communes of the Rhône department

References

Communes of Rhône (department)